This is a list of songs written by Bob Crewe.

Chart hits and other notable songs written by Bob Crewe

References

Crewe, Bob